Roger Maxwell real name Roger Done Latham (1 January 1900 – 24 November 1971) was an English actor and first-class cricketer.

The son of Alexander Mere Latham, he was born at Chelsea on New Year's Day in 1900. He was educated at Wellington College, completing his education there in 1917. With the First World War ongoing, Maxwell attended the Royal Military College, Sandhurst from which he graduated into the Middlesex Regiment as a second lieutenant in August 1918. Following the war, he was promoted to lieutenant in September 1921, which was antedated to February 1920. Maxwell played first-class cricket for the Marylebone Cricket Club (MCC) against the British Army cricket team at Lord's in June 1920. Batting once in the match, he ended the MCC's first innings unbeaten on 16, sharing in a 58 runs stand for the final wicket with Richard Busk.

Progressing into a career in acting, Maxwell's first role was in the 1927 docudrama The Battles of Coronel and Falkland Islands. 
On stage he appeared in the West End in Ian Hay's Leave It to Psmith and Off the Record, Terence Rattigan's Who Is Sylvia? and Peter Jones's The Party Spirit.

In 1959, he was a member of the jury at the Venice Film Festival.

Maxwell died on the Isle of Man at Onchan in November 1971.

Filmography

References

External links

Roger Maxwell career list of roles; Aveleyman website

1900 births
1971 deaths
Male actors from London
People educated at Wellington College, Berkshire
Graduates of the Royal Military College, Sandhurst
Middlesex Regiment officers
British Army personnel of World War I
English cricketers
Marylebone Cricket Club cricketers
20th-century English male actors
English male stage actors
English male film actors
English male television actors